Rečane is a village in the municipality of Gostivar, North Macedonia.

Demographics
As of the 2021 census, Rečane had 683 residents with the following ethnic composition:
Albanians 664
Persons for whom data are taken from administrative sources 18
Macedonians 1

According to the 2002 census, the village had a total of 1054 inhabitants. Ethnic groups in the village include:

Albanians 1038
Others 16

Sports
Local football club KF Përparimi have played in the Macedonian Third League.

References

Notable people
 Nazmi Mehmeti (1918-1995) - Albanian community leader in New Zealand

External links

Villages in Gostivar Municipality
Albanian communities in North Macedonia